The Dutch Pinball Museum is a museum in Rotterdam, the Netherlands. The museum is home to more than 130 different pinball machines ranging from 1930 to today and also includes a rare toupie hollandaise table from the year 1853.

History
The museum originated out of a private collection of founder Gerard van de Sanden. The museum opened on 29 August 2015 but was officially opened by former Dutch Finance Minister Gerrit Zalm on 26 November 2015. The museum opened on the Paul Nijghkade in Katendrecht, but later moved to the Dubbele Palmboom in Delfshaven.

Collection
The collection consists of 31 electromechanical pinball machines, 43 Solid State pinball machines, and 60 Dot-Matrix pinball machines, as well as an original toupie hollandaise from 1853, which is seen as the predecessor of pinball. All machines made before 1960 are on display. The other machines can be played.

References

Pinball museums
Museums in Rotterdam